Yeh Chu-mei (born 12 June 1944) is a Taiwanese sprinter. She competed in the 200 metres at the 1964 Summer Olympics and the 1968 Summer Olympics.

References

1944 births
Living people
Athletes (track and field) at the 1964 Summer Olympics
Athletes (track and field) at the 1968 Summer Olympics
Taiwanese female sprinters
Taiwanese female hurdlers
Olympic athletes of Taiwan
Place of birth missing (living people)
Asian Games medalists in athletics (track and field)
Asian Games silver medalists for Chinese Taipei
Athletes (track and field) at the 1966 Asian Games
Medalists at the 1966 Asian Games